Saint Vincent and the Grenadines has a two-party system, which means that there are two dominant political parties, with extreme difficulty for electoral success of smaller parties.

Parties holding office

Other parties

Historical parties
 Saint Vincent and the Grenadines Labour Party (1956–1994) - social democratic
 Movement for National Unity (until 1994)
 People's Political Party
People's Progressive Movement
United People's Movement
 Democratic Republican Party
 National Reform Party
 Progressive Labour Party

See also
 Politics of Saint Vincent and the Grenadines
 List of political parties by country

References

Saint Vincent and the Grenadines
 
Political parties
Saint VIncent
Political parties